Rare, Precious and Beautiful is the compilation released by the Bee Gees in 1967 on Polydor Records; in Germany, the compilation was released on Karussell and Forum Records. All of the songs on this album were originally released on the group's 1966 album Spicks and Specks. It was also issued in 1968 by Atco Records as catalogue number SD 33-264 in electronically rechanneled simulated stereo.

The release was followed by a Volume 2 and Volume 3.

Track listing

References

1968 compilation albums
Bee Gees compilation albums
Polydor Records compilation albums